Cultura is the second studio album by Gibraltarian Flamenco Metal quintet Breed 77. It was released through J. Albert Productions on 3 May 2004. Three singles were released from this album, which were "La Última Hora", "The River" and "World's on Fire". The album features ten original songs and three remastered songs from their previous release. Cultura reached number 61 on the UK albums chart.

Track listing
All tracks written by Paul Isola, Danny Felice, Pedro Caparros López & Stuart Cavilla.

 "Voices" – 1:09
 "Individuo" – 3:21
 "La Última Hora" – 4:04
 "A Matter of Time" – 4:22
 "World's on Fire" – 3:57
 "The River" – 5:15
 "The Only Ones" – 3:49
 "Resurrection" – 5:21
 "Numb" – 4:02
 "Calling Out" – 4:13
 "Eyes That See '04" – 4:31
 "Oración Final" - 5:58
 "Breaking the Silence (Acoustic)" - 5:14

References

2004 albums
Breed 77 albums